Braslaw or Braslav is a town in Vitebsk Region, Belarus, and the administrative center of Braslaw District.

History
The town was first mentioned in 1065 as a castle in the border of the Polatsk Principality with the Lithuanian tribes. Archaeologists excavated a Viking settlement in the village of Maskachichy not far from the town. They think that Viking mercenaries were used as dependable border guards. In the 14th century, Braslaw was incorporated into the Grand Duchy of Lithuania and, in fact, became an important fortification near the disturbing line with the Livonian Order in the 14th and 15th centuries. In 1500, Alexander Jagiellon privileged the townsfolk with limited self-administration rights and a coat of arms. In 1506, the castle was presented to the widowed queen Yelena Ivanovna, the daughter of Ivan III of Russia and wife of Alexander Jagiellon, who founded an Orthodox Christian nunnery there. The town was much developed thanks to its praepostor Lev Sapeha and the king Stanisław August Poniatowski.

From 1795 to 1919 Braslaw was part of Russian Empire. After Third Partition of Poland, Braslaw became an uyezd center (county seat) in Vilna Governorate in 1795, later in Kovno Governorate in 1843 except brief French occupation in 1812. It was occupied by the German Empire for 10 months in 1918. According to the Treaty of Riga, it became Polish. It was a powiat center (county seat) in Wilno Voivodeship. In 1939 eastern Poland was annexed by the USSR and Braslawit became part of the Belarusian Soviet Socialist Republic.

Around 3,000 Jews lived in Braslav at the eve of World War II, more than the half of the inhabitants.

It was occupied by Nazi Germany between 27 June 1941 and 6 June 1944 and administered as a part of the Generalbezirk Weißruthenien of Reichskommissariat Ostland. In April 1942, a ghetto was established. The liquidation of the ghetto began on 3 June 1942. Many Jews tried to escape but around 2,000 Jews were arrested and shot in ditches that had been prepared. In late 1942, the Jews from the nearby village of Opsa were gathered in Braslav. They were killed in March 1943.

It was a raion center, first in Vileyka Voblast, then in Polatsk Voblast between 1944 and 1954 and finally in Molodechno Voblast between 1954 and 1960 before passing to Vitebsk. Since the 1920s, Braslaw has developed as a cheap summer resort. In 1995, it accommodated the main office of the National Park of the Braslaw Lakes.

Population
In 1948, Braslaw had a population in excess of 2000 people. In 2009, the total population of Braslaw was 9,516 people.

Events
Viva Braslav is one of the most important and largest music weekends in the country. The event is held annually, traditionally in the last days of August. The main feature of the festival is famous music performers, the list of which is updated from year to year. It should be said that the event has become one of the most important events associated with the Belarusian city of Braslav.

References

External links

 Official website
 Photos on Radzima.org
 Braslav at KehilaLinks
 

Braslaw District
Holocaust locations in Belarus
Novoalexandrovsky Uyezd
Populated places in Vitebsk Region
Towns in Belarus
Vilnius Voivodeship
Wilno Voivodeship (1926–1939)